Gangster's Den is a 1945 American Producers Releasing Corporation Western film of the "Billy the Kid" series directed by Sam Newfield. The film is notable for having three comedy relief characters; Al St. John, Emmett Lynn, and Charles King, who usually plays the villain.

Plot
Fuzzy (Al St. John) is upset that the ranch hands spend their time and money at a saloon where they lose their money drinking and gambling. Fuzzy decides to buy the saloon to keep an eye on the men and moderate their vices, but a shifty lawyer has other ideas and plans to use murder to get his way.

Cast
Buster Crabbe as Billy Carson
Al St. John as Fuzzy Jones
Sydney Logan as Ruth Lane
Charles King as Butch
Emmett Lynn as Webb aka Webfoot
Kermit Maynard as Henchman Curt
Ed Cassidy as Sheriff
I. Stanford Jolley as Lawyer Horace Black
George Chesebro as Dent, Black Henchman
Karl Hackett as Old Man Taylor, Bar Owner
Michael Owen as Jimmy Lane, Ruth's Brother

See also
The "Billy the Kid" films starring Buster Crabbe: 
 Billy the Kid Wanted (1941)
 Billy the Kid's Round-Up (1941)
 Billy the Kid Trapped (1942)
 Billy the Kid's Smoking Guns (1942)
 Law and Order (1942) 
 Sheriff of Sage Valley (1942) 
 The Mysterious Rider (1942)
 The Kid Rides Again (1943)
 Fugitive of the Plains (1943)
 Western Cyclone (1943)
 Cattle Stampede (1943)
 The Renegade (1943)
 Blazing Frontier (1943)
 Devil Riders (1943)
 Frontier Outlaws (1944)
 Valley of Vengeance (1944)
 The Drifter (1944) 
 Fuzzy Settles Down (1944)
 Rustlers' Hideout (1944)
 Wild Horse Phantom (1944)
 Oath of Vengeance (1944)
 His Brother's Ghost (1945) 
 Thundering Gunslingers (1945)
 Shadows of Death (1945)
 Gangster's Den (1945)
 Stagecoach Outlaws (1945)
 Border Badmen (1945)
 Fighting Bill Carson (1945)
 Prairie Rustlers (1945) 
 Lightning Raiders (1945)
 Terrors on Horseback (1946)
 Gentlemen with Guns (1946)
 Ghost of Hidden Valley (1946)
 Prairie Badmen (1946)
 Overland Riders (1946)
 Outlaws of the Plains (1946)

External links

1945 films
1945 Western (genre) films
1940s English-language films
American black-and-white films
Billy the Kid (film series)
American Western (genre) films
Films with screenplays by George H. Plympton
Films directed by Sam Newfield
1940s American films